Ian Evans may refer to:

 Ian Evans (historian) (born 1940), Australian author, publisher and historian
 Ian Evans (footballer) (born 1952), Welsh former footballer
 Ian Evans (cricketer) (born 1982), English cricketer
 Ian Evans (rugby player) (born 1984), Welsh rugby union player

See also
 Iain Evans (born 1960), politician
 Iain Evans (field hockey) (born 1981), South African field hockey player